Gerd Kühn (born 15 March 1968) is a German former professional footballer who played as a right midfielder.

References

1968 births
Living people
German footballers
Association football midfielders
Bundesliga players
2. Bundesliga players
Bayer 04 Leverkusen players
KFC Uerdingen 05 players
Rot-Weiß Oberhausen players